Snow Lake Peak is the fifth-highest named mountain of the Ruby Mountains and the seventh-highest in Elko County, in Nevada, United States. It is the forty-second-highest mountain in the state. It rises from the head of Box Canyon (above Snow Lake), is part of the headwall of Thomas Canyon (with Mount Fitzgerald), and is a prominent part of the west wall of Lamoille Canyon above Lamoille and Dollar Lakes. The peak is located within the Ruby Mountains Wilderness of the Ruby Mountains Ranger District in the Humboldt-Toiyabe National Forest.

Geography 
It is the only major peak of the Ruby Mountains that cannot be reached via a scramble.

References

External links 
 

Ruby Mountains
Mountains of Nevada
Mountains of Elko County, Nevada
Humboldt–Toiyabe National Forest